The Skif or Stuhna-P (Ukrainian: Стугна-П) is a Ukrainian anti-tank guided missile (ATGM) system developed in the early 2010s by the Luch Design Bureau. The initial guidance device ПН-С of the Skif was developed and manufactured by Belarusian design bureau Peleng based in Minsk before the crisis of 2014 while the Stuhna-P uses a domestic Ukrainian ПН-І guidance device.
By the 2018, both Skif and Stuhna-P variants were using unified ПН-І (PN-I) guidance device.  Skif is the Ukrainian word for Scythian and Stuhna is the name of a local river.

The Skif is designed to destroy modern armored targets with combined carried or monolithic armor, including explosive reactive armor (ERA). Skifs can attack both stationary and moving targets. They can attack point targets such as weapon emplacements, lightly armored objects, and hovering helicopters. The Skif has two targeting modes: manually steered, and automated fire-and-forget that uses no manual tracking of a target. In 2018, an upgraded export variant of the Skif was tested by the Ukrainian military.

Design
The Skif consists of a tripod, missile container, PDU-215 remote control panel, guidance device, and thermographic camera (thermal imager).

Two firing modes are available: manual, and fire-and-forget. Fire-and-forget provides automatic control of the missile flight using a targeting laser beam.

A three to four-person team is optimal for deploying the Skif. Operators require specially-made backpacks. Once the missile is fired, the operator controls the Skif and corrects the aim when needed, by using the joystick on the remote control. The Skif's system has a shelf life of 15 years. The missiles have a 10-year shelf life.

The system comes complete with 130 mm and 152 mm caliber missiles in transport and launching containers. Tandem charge high-explosive anti-tank (HEAT) RK-2S warheads might be able to counter medium weight main battle tanks such as the T-90A with penetration of  behind ERA. RK-2M-K warheads might be able to counter heavy main battle tanks such as M1A2 Abrams with their penetration of  behind ERA. The system also includes high explosive (HE) fragmentation RK-2OF and RK-2М-OF warheads to attack infantry positions and light armored vehicles. The system can use all four types of missiles with no modification. The system's thermal imager can be used during night operations. According to a 2014 article, SLX-Hawk thermal imaging camera produced by Selex ES can be installed for use at night and in poor visibility conditions.

Variants
The system has four types of missiles in two different calibers.

130 mm missiles

System configuration with 130 mm missiles using RK-2S and RK-2OF warheads. This or a very similar version is fielded by the Ukrainian armed forces as the Stuhna-P (Stugna-P).
Missile caliber: 130 mm
Firing range (day): 
Firing range (night): 
Full system weight: 
Missile in container weight: 
Warhead penetration:
RK-2S tandem-charge HEAT: Not less than  RHA behind ERA
RK-2OF HE-fragmentation: Not less than  RHA with at least 600 fragments
Container length:

152 mm missiles

System configuration with 152 mm missiles using RK-2M-K and RK-2М-OF warheads:
Missile caliber: 152 mm
Firing range (day): 
Firing range (night): 
Full system weight: 
Missile in container weight: 
Warhead penetration:
RK-2M-K tandem-charge HEAT: Not less than  RHA behind ERA
RK-2М-OF HE-fragmentation: Not less than RHA with at least 1000 fragments
Container length:

SERDAR
SERDAR is a stabilized remote controlled weapon station (RCWS). The system was developed jointly by the Luch Design Bureau, Turkish company Aselsan Spets, and Techno Export, part of Ukraine’s Ukroboronprom enterprise. The system carries two (in some versions four) 130 mm or 152 mm missiles with RK-2S or RK-2M-K tandem-charge HEAT warheads. The system is also equipped with 12.7 mm and 7.62 mm caliber machine guns. A joint company for the production of Skif missiles was established in Turkey and production began in early 2020.

Shershen

Shershen is a Belarusian ATGM based on Skif. It also has different types of 130 mm and 152 mm missiles.

Operational history

The missile system was used during the pre-2022 Russo-Ukrainian War by Ukrainian forces following first deliveries in 2018. However, it gained wider prominence against Russian Army forces during the 2022 Russian invasion of Ukraine beginning in February alongside anti-tank systems provided by NATO countries such as the FGM-148 Javelin (US), NLAW (UK), and Panzerfaust 3 (Germany). On April 5, 2022, Ukrainian forces used the missile system to down a Russian Kamov Ka-52 attack helicopter.

As the war has moved to the Donbas and fighting has changed from wooded areas to open plains, the missile has been fitted to light vehicles to make it mobile. The Stugna-P is being used in the same way US forces used the TOW missile system in the 1980s and the Gulf War Desert Patrol Vehicle. Its increased range gives it an edge over the NLAW and Javelin missiles. On 25 April, near Izyum, during one engagement four tanks were destroyed or damaged in 4 minutes by the same Stugna-P operator. The Skif missile also costs some three times less than the Javelin missile.

Many of the missiles were to be exported to Middle Eastern countries. However, upon the outbreak of war these export models were used by Ukrainian soldiers. 

According to Ukrainian soldiers, one missile has hit a Russian tank at 5,300 meters (300 m beyond the nominal maximum range of 5 km).

Users

See also
RK-3 Corsar, another Ukrainian ATGM
Shershen
9M133 Kornet
OMTAS

References

Anti-tank guided missiles of Ukraine
Weapons and ammunition introduced in 2011
Fire-and-forget weapons